Alexander J. Clements (c. 1866 − 4 December 1933) was a supervisor of roads in Hudson County, New Jersey, for twenty years before his death. He worked as a cabinetmaker and then at the Pennsylvania Railroad before going into politics; he became leader of the First Ward in Jersey City. He owned a saloon named the Old Stone House, at Newark Avenue and Grove Street. He made failed attempts to run for office, as Sheriff and as Councilman, both in Jersey City.

In 1911 he and thirteen other men were indicted for fraud in connection with contracting bids for the building of the courthouse in Jersey City, for which the budget was $3,500,000.

He died of a heart condition on 4 December 1933 at the Medical Centre in Jersey City.

Footnotes 

1860s births
1933 deaths
Hudson County, New Jersey